Harpactocarcinus is an extinct genus of mud crabs.

Fossil record
This genus is known in the fossil record from the end of the Cretaceous to the Miocene. Fossils within this genus have been found in Iran, Europe, Turkey, Mexico, United States and New Zealand.

Species
 Harpactocarcinus almerae Via, 1941
 Harpactocarcinus americanus Rathbun, 1928
 Harpactocarcinus dalmatius Schweitzer et al., 2007
 Harpactocarcinus fedrigoi Beshin, De Angeli & Zorzin, 2014
 Harpactocarcinus istriensis Bachmayer and Nosan, 1959
 Harpactocarcinus jacquoti Milne-Edwards, 1865
 Harpactocarcinus macrodactylus Milne-Edwards, 1850
 Harpactocarcinus miocenicus Vega et al., 2010
 Harpactocarcinus multidentatus Stubblefield, 1946
 Harpactocarcinus ovalis Milne-Edwards, 1862
 Harpactocarcinus punctulatus Milne-Edwards, 1862
 Harpactocarcinus rotundatus Milne-Edwards, 1862
 Harpactocarcinus wilkeningi Bachmayer and Mundlos, 1968
 Harpactocarcinus yozgatensis Schweitzer et al., 2007

References

Crabs